William H. Press (born April 8, 1940) is an American talk radio host, podcaster, liberal pundit and author. He was chairman of the California Democratic Party from 1993 to 1996, and is a senior political contributor on CNN. He hosts The Bill Press Pod podcast, and his weekly column is syndicated by Tribune Content Agency.

Education
Born in Wilmington, Delaware, and raised in Delaware City, Delaware, Press was educated at Salesianum School, a private Roman Catholic secondary school in Wilmington, in 1958, followed by Niagara University from which he gained a Bachelor of Arts degree in Philosophy, and the University of Fribourg in which he gained a Bachelor of Sacred Theology degree.

Life and career
Press is a long-time resident of Inverness, California, having moved there in 1970. He resides in Washington, D.C.

Press started his broadcasting career in Los Angeles for TV stations KABC-TV and KCOP-TV. He has worked as a political commentator for CNN and MSNBC. He is best known for co-hosting CNN's Spin Room opposite Tucker Carlson, and Crossfire and MSNBC's Buchanan and Press.

Since May 2005, Press has been a contributing blogger at The Huffington Post. He also contributes blogs to The Hill. In January 2012, Press filled in for Keith Olbermann on Current TV's coverage of the 2012 Florida Republican primary.

In politics
Press was the chairman of the California Democratic Party from 1993 to 1996.

He previously served in different appointed positions such as a chief of staff to Republican California State Senator Peter Behr (1971–73), and as director of the California Office of Planning and Research under Democratic Governor Jerry Brown (1975–79).

Radio talk show
Since September 2005, Press has been hosting a daily liberal talk radio program, The Bill Press Show. It is heard on satellite radio, streamed live from the show's website, and available from the show's YouTube channel.

It was formerly broadcast on terrestrial radio affiliates in the United States live from 6-9 AM ET. Originally syndicated by Jones Radio, the radio show was syndicated by Dial Global until 2017. On March 5, 2012, the show was announced to be simulcast on Current TV alongside The Stephanie Miller Show as part of morning programming. As a result of Current TV becoming Al Jazeera America, The Bill Press Show moved to Free Speech TV, where it stayed until its move to The Young Turks Network in 2016. As part of the move to the Turks, terrestrial syndication of the program was dropped in January 2017 (except for WCPT-AM Chicago).

Religion
Press was steeped in Catholicism from an early age. He was an altar boy and took vows of obedience, poverty and chastity. He describes his young self as a "soldier in God's army".

Works
 Eyewitness : A California Perspective, 1988. 
 Spin This: All the Ways We Don't Tell the Truth, with a foreword by Bill Maher, 2002. 
 Bush Must Go!- The Top Ten Reasons Why George Bush Doesn't Deserve a Second Term, 2004. 
 How The Republicans Stole Christmas: The Republican Party's Declared Monopoly on Religion and What Democrats Can Do to Take it Back, 2005. 
 How The Republicans Stole Religion: Why the Religious Right is Wrong about Faith & Politics and What We Can Do to Make it Right, Doubleday, 2005. 
 Trainwreck: The End of the Conservative Revolution (and Not a Moment Too Soon), Wiley, 2008.

References

External links

 
 
 

1940 births
Living people
20th-century American non-fiction writers
20th-century Roman Catholics
21st-century American non-fiction writers
21st-century Roman Catholics
American bloggers
American columnists
American male non-fiction writers
American political commentators
American political writers
American talk radio hosts
California Democratic Party chairs
California Democrats
HuffPost writers and columnists
Journalists from Washington, D.C.
MSNBC people
Niagara University alumni
People from Delaware City, Delaware
People from Inverness, California
University of Fribourg alumni
Writers from Wilmington, Delaware
The Young Turks people
Catholics from Delaware
Catholics from California
Liberalism in the United States
Salesianum School alumni
20th-century American male writers
21st-century American male writers